The Roman Catholic hermitage of Our Lady of the Enclosed Garden is situated in the former Reformed church of Warfhuizen, a village in the extreme north of the Netherlands. It is the only Dutch hermitage currently inhabited by a hermit. The name draws upon the traditional epithet for the Virgin Mary ("Our Lady") of hortus conclusus or enclosed garden, a reference to the Song of Songs that indicates the Virgin's "perpetual virginity and at the same time her fruitful maternity".

The hermitage was founded in 2001 as the dwelling of a diocesan hermit. As is typical of Dutch hermitages, it includes a public chapel that has a distinct role in popular devotions, here to the Virgin Mary. It is the northernmost Marian shrine in the Netherlands.

History
The hermitage in Warfhuizen is a continuation of the tradition of hermits which arose in Limburg and North Brabant, following the Counter Reformation. The last brother of that tradition died in 1930 in de Schaelsberg hermitage in Valkenburg aan de Geul. Contrary to most hermitages abroad, these hermitages featured a public chapel which often played a part in local devotions.

After a slow decline since the 1880s, the number of Roman Catholic hermits in Europe started to increase again towards the end of the 20th century, although the Netherlands did initially lag in this development. There have always been members of religious orders who lived as hermits, but the 'true hermits' became extinct after 1930. The old hermitages were left empty and mostly disappeared. In 2001, the empty church of the village of Warfhuizen was acquired by Catholics and a simple hermit's dwelling was realised in the bay adjacent to the tower, which since then has been inhabited by a hermit (Brother Hugo). The rest of the building serves as a chapel. The hermit belongs to the Diocese of Groningen-Leeuwarden. He was ordained a priest September 2015.

Since the Second Vatican Council revitalised the eremitical ideal, a small amount of new legislation has been created. The Code of Canon Law, can. 603, requires hermits to be more secluded than was the custom in the Netherlands. As a result, there is an enclosed area in Warfhuizen in which the hermit lives and works. In the chapel this is created by the large rood screen which separates the choir from the nave.

Office and customs

Similar to contemplative monasteries, the Office is kept in Warfhuizen. In the West, that is often prayed in accordance with the precepts of Saint Benedict, but in 2009, the hermit switched to the office of Saint John Cassian from the 5th century. Cassian based his schedule on the customs of the hermits in the Egyptian desert, the so-called Desert Fathers. As such, it is very suitable for hermits.

Instead of the eight (usually short) offices of Benedict, Cassian prescribes two (longer) vigils, one at the start and one at the end of the night. In Warfhuizen, these vigils are sung softly in Latin. The other hours do not have an office with Psalms, but are prayed in silence by means of the Jesus Prayer.

As such, the modern Warfhuizen office clearly deviates from that of the ancient Dutch hermits, who usually used a (shorter version of) the Liturgy of the Hours of Benedict. But the influence of the Limburgian tradition on the atmosphere in the hermitage remains clearly noticeable through the various additions from popular devotions, such as praying the Rosary and various litanies, which are sung at various moments during the day, out loud. The chapel's decorations also betray a continuation of 17th century examples, through Baroque elements. The devotion to Saint Gerlach of Houthem, of whom there is a reliquary in the retable of the right side altar, has a special place in the hermitage. Saint Anthony Abbot is also especially honoured. A relic of him is kept in the Holy Cross altar.

In addition to the old southern tradition, there are also other influences on the liturgy. The fact that some of the volunteers are of the Russian Orthodox faith has led to the Jesus Prayer being sung (in Greek) after Compline. The Carthusian tradition is noticeable in the manner of executing Gregorian chant.

Eucharistic Adoration

Since May 2009, the bishop of Groningen-Leeuwarden has appointed the hermitage of Warfhuizen as a place where Eucharistic adoration could take place. Since then this, including the Rosary for pilgrims, takes place every day at 4 pm.

Warfhuizen as a Marian pilgrimage site

Most visitors to the chapel specifically come to venerate Mary. This began after a life-size processional statue, the 'Sorrowful mother of Warfhuizen', was placed in the chapel. The statue had such an appeal to faithful from the Netherlands and abroad that the chapel became a pilgrimage site.

See also
 Marian art in the Catholic Church
 Marian devotions
 Roman Catholic Mariology

References

External links 

 Website of the hermitage
 Website of the shrine
 Diary of Brother Hugo (in Dutch)
 Miguel Bejarano Moreno (in Spanish)
 

Het Hogeland
Christian hermitages in the Netherlands
Roman Catholic shrines in the Netherlands
Marian devotions
Shrines to the Virgin Mary
Buildings and structures in Groningen (province)
Rijksmonuments in Groningen (province)
Tourist attractions in Groningen (province)